Susan Park is an American actress.

Early life 
Park was born in the United States, the daughter of Korean immigrants.

Career
Park began acting in 2009. In 2010 she performed in a one-woman show titled Diaries of a K-Town Diva directed by Barbara Tarbuck.

In 2013, Park joined the cast of ABC's Revenge and in 2014 she had a role in FX's Fargo.

Filmography

Film

Television

References

External links
 

Living people
American television actresses
American actresses of Korean descent
American film actresses
21st-century American actresses
Place of birth missing (living people)
1984 births